Carry On Jack is a 1964 British comedy film, the eighth in the series of 31 Carry On films (1958–1992). Most of the usual Carry On team are missing from this film: only Kenneth Williams and Charles Hawtrey appear throughout, with Jim Dale making a cameo appearance as a sedan chair carrier. Bernard Cribbins makes the first of his three appearances in a Carry On. Juliet Mills, Donald Houston and Cecil Parker make their only Carry on appearances in this film.  Carry On Jack was the second of the series to be filmed in colour and the first Carry On film with a historical setting and period costumes.

As with its immediate predecessor, the script for Carry on Jack started off as a non-Carry On film (originally entitled Up the Armada) and after a number of title changes was incorporated into the series.

Plot
Carry On Jack starts with the death of Admiral Horatio Nelson (Jimmy Thompson), whose last words are that Britain needs a bigger navy with more men, followed by his famous request for a kiss to Hardy (Anton Rodgers). In the main story, Albert Poop-Decker (Bernard Cribbins) has taken 8 years and still not qualified as midshipman, but is promoted by the First Sea Lord (Cecil Parker) as England needs officers. He is to join the frigate HMS Venus at Plymouth. Arriving to find the crew all celebrating as they are sailing tomorrow, he takes a sedan chair with no bottom (so he has to run), carried by a young man and his father (Jim Dale and Ian Wilson, respectively) to Dirty Dick's Tavern.

Mobbed by women in the tavern as he is holding a sovereign aloft (as advised by Dale), he is rescued by serving maid, Sally (Juliet Mills). She wants to go to sea to find her former lodger and childhood sweetheart Roger, but landlord Ned (George Woodbridge) has let her down. She finds that Poop-Decker has not reported to the ship yet and is unknown to them, so in a room upstairs she knocks him out and takes his midshipman's uniform.

Poop-Decker wakes and dons a dress to cover his long johns, and downstairs, along with a cess pit cleaner named Walter Sweetly (Charles Hawtrey), is kidnapped by a press gang run by the Venus'''s First Officer Lieutenant Jonathan Howett (Donald Houston) and his bosun, Mr Angel (Percy Herbert). They come to when at sea and are introduced to Captain Fearless (Kenneth Williams). Poop-Decker makes himself known, but there is already a Midshipman Poop-Decker aboardSally, in disguise. Poop-Decker, as a hopeless seaman, goes on to continually upset Howett by doing the wrong thing. Sally reveals her true identity to Poop-Decker after he has been punished, and he decides to let things continue as they are. Eventually, in the course of the film Poop-Decker and Sally fall in love with each other.

After three months at sea and no action, the crew are very restless, and when they finally see a Spanish ship, the Captain has them sail away from it. Howett and Angel hatch a plot, making it look like the ship has been boarded by the enemy during a night raid and using Poop-Decker as an expendable dupe to get the Captain leave the ship on his own volition. Poop-Decker, Sweetly and Sally thus help the Captain into a boat, and they leave the ship, but while leaving his cabin, the Captain gets a splinter in his foot, which later goes gangrenous. When they reach dry land, Captain Fearless reckons that they are in France and they need only to walk a short distance to reach Calais, while they are actually standing on Spanish soil. Sally and Poop-Decker spot a party of civilians and steal their clothes while they are bathing.

Now in charge of the ship, Howett and Angel sail for Cadiz and plan on taking it from Don Luis (Patrick Cargill), the Spanish Governor. They are successful, but their plot is ruined by Poop-Decker's group, who stumble into Cadiz (believing it to be Le Havre) and recapture the Venus. Sailing back to England, they encounter a pirate ship, whose crew seizes the Venus. The Captain (Patch, played by Peter Gilmore) turns out to be Sally's lost love Roger, but upon seeing him as a coarse, brutal rogue, she no longer wants to have anything to do with him. In order to force her compliance, Patch and Hook (Ed Devereaux) try to make Poop-Decker and Fearless walk the plank, but Poop-Decker manages to escape and cut down a sail, which covers the pirates, capturing them.

In Cadiz, the former crew of the Venus are taken to be shot, but escape with five empty Spanish men-of-war to England for prize money and glory. They are within sight of England when they encounter the Venus. While Poop-Decker, Sally and Walter are working below decks on cutting off Fearless's badly infected leg, a fire gets out of control on deck and burns a sail, which sets off the Venuss primed cannons, hitting all five Spanish ships and thus once again thwarting Howett. Poop-Decker and his companions end up at the Admiralty as heroes. Fearless, who now has a pegleg is promoted to Admiral and given a desk job. Poop-Decker and Sweetly are given the rank of honorary Captains, with pensions, but Poop-Decker reveals that he is going to leave the service to marry Sally.

Background

The overall plot in relation to Sally steals the idea from episode 2 of the British TV series "Sir Francis Drake" made three years earlier (1961). In this episode a girl (the daughter of a ship's gunner) stows away on Drake's ship dressed as a man.

Cast

Kenneth Williams as Captain Fearless
Bernard Cribbins as Midshipman Albert Poop-Decker
Juliet Mills as Sally
Charles Hawtrey as Walter Sweetley
Percy Herbert as Mr Angel
Donald Houston as First Officer Jonathan Howett
Jim Dale as Carrier
Cecil Parker as First Sealord
Patrick Cargill as Spanish Governor
Ed Devereaux as Hook
Peter Gilmore as Patch
George Woodbridge as Ned
Ian Wilson as Ancient carrier
Jimmy Thompson as Nelson
Anton Rodgers as Hardy
Michael Nightingale as Town Crier
Frank Forsyth as Second Sealord
John Brooking as Third Sealord
Barrie Gosney as Coach driver
Jan Mazurus as Spanish Captain
Viviane Ventura as Spanish secretary
Marianne Stone as Peg
Sally Douglas as Girl at Dirty Dicks (uncredited)
Dorinda Stevens as Girl at Dirty Dicks (uncredited)
Jennifer Hill as Girl at Dirty Dicks (uncredited)
Rosemary Manley as Girl at Dirty Dicks (uncredited)
Dominique Don as Girl at Dirty Dicks (uncredited)
Marian Collins as Girl at Dirty Dicks (uncredited)
Jean Hamilton as Girl at Dirty Dicks (uncredited)

Crew
ScreenplayTalbot Rothwell
MusicEric Rogers
Art DirectorJack Shampan
Director of PhotographyAlan Hume
EditorArchie Ludski
Associate ProducerFrank Bevis
Assistant DirectorAnthony Waye
Camera OperatorGodfrey Godar
Sound EditorChristopher Lancaster
Sound RecordistBill Daniels
Unit ManagerDonald Toms
Make-up ArtistsGeoffrey Rodway & Jim Hydes
ContinuityPenny Daniels
HairdressingOlga Angelinetta
Costume DesignerJoan Ellacott
Technical AdvisorIan Cox
ProducerPeter Rogers
DirectorGerald Thomas

Filming and locations

Filming dates: 2 September26 October 1963Interiors:
 Pinewood Studios, BuckinghamshireExteriors':
 Frensham Pond.  The background to the scenes with HMS Venus on fire and "firing" on the other ships is Kimmeridge Bay, Dorset.

ReceptionKinematograph Weekly called the film a "money maker" for 1964.

BibliographyKeeping the British End Up: Four Decades of Saucy Cinema'' by Simon Sheridan (third edition) (2007) (Reynolds & Hearn Books)

References

External links
 

1963 films
1963 comedy films
British historical comedy films
Jack
1960s English-language films
Films directed by Gerald Thomas
Films set in 1805
Films set in England
Films set in Spain
Films shot at Pinewood Studios
Military humor in film
Napoleonic Wars naval films
British swashbuckler films
Seafaring films
Films produced by Peter Rogers
Films with screenplays by Talbot Rothwell
1964 comedy films
1964 films
1960s British films